Jarvis is an unincorporated community in Jefferson County, in the U.S. state of Missouri. Jarvis is located approximately 1.5 miles northwest of Mapaville and 2.5 miles southeast of Goldman.

History
A post office called Jarvis was established in 1888, and remained in operation until 1900. The community has the name of Thornton Jarvis, an early settler.

References

Unincorporated communities in Jefferson County, Missouri
Unincorporated communities in Missouri